The Heidelberg Faculty of Theology is one of twelve faculties at the University of Heidelberg. It was one of the four founding faculties in 1386.

Notes and references

Heidelberg University
Christian seminaries and theological colleges